Charles Maerschalck (1887 – 6 March 1954) was a Belgian gymnast. He competed in the men's team, Swedish system event at the 1920 Summer Olympics, winning the bronze medal.

References

External links
 

Date of birth missing
1887 births
1954 deaths
Belgian male artistic gymnasts
Olympic gymnasts of Belgium
Gymnasts at the 1920 Summer Olympics
Olympic bronze medalists for Belgium
Medalists at the 1920 Summer Olympics
Olympic medalists in gymnastics
Place of birth missing